Dame Rosamund Mary Holland-Martin, DBE, DL (née Hornby; 26 June 1914, London – 18 June 2001) was a British long-term leader and fund-raiser for the National Society for the Prevention of Cruelty to Children (NSPCC).

NSPCC

Holland-Martin was part of the NSPCC for over 50 years, serving as chairman of the Central Executive Committee for nearly two decades (1969 - 1988). During her decades with the charity, she played a crucial role in the establishment of the NSPCC's position as Britain's leading child protection organisation and helped to engineer its development into a modern professional body.

Dame Holland-Martin played a significant role in fund-raising for the  organisation's 1984 centenary appeal, the largest charitable appeal ever planned and executed in the UK, which exceeded its fundraising goal.  Holland-Martin was vital to the success of the appeal, including, alongside the NSPCC's president Princess Margaret, persuading the Duke of Westminster to chair the Appeal. Due to its success, the Appeal became a blueprint for other charities, such as Great Ormond Street Hospital. The Centenary Charter set the agenda for the future direction of the society.

After 19 years in the chair she retired in 1988, but she never lost interest and she continued to attend meetings and speak whenever invited. By the time she left, the NSPCC had increased the funds it raised from under £500,000 in 1947 to more than £20 million a year.

Family life
She was the fifth child of St John Hornby, a founding partner of W. H. Smith and a deputy vice-chairman of the NSPCC, and his wife, Cecily. St John Hornby was a public speaker, a bookman and collector of medieval and Renaissance manuscripts and printed books. His private Ashendene Press printed 40 works between 1895 and 1935.

In 1942, Rosamund Hornby joined the Women's Voluntary Services (WVS), giving up her job as assistant matron of the girls' school which had been evacuated in 1939 to Chantmarle, the family home in Dorset. The WVS was led by Stella, Dowager Marchioness of Reading.

Personal life
In 1951, Hornby married Captain Douglas Eric "Deric" Holland-Martin (later Admiral Sir Deric Holland-Martin), a naval officer (10 April 1906 - 1977), fourth son of Robert Martin Holland-Martin.

They had two children, Emma and Benjamin, who both work for the NSPCC. Lady Holland-Martin went twice to Valletta, Malta, while her husband was Commander-in-Chief of Allied Forces in the Mediterranean. They lived in Bell's Castle, Kemerton, Worcestershire.

Later life

After her husband's death in 1977, she took on his former role as a Deputy Lieutenant for Hereford and Worcester. She also became a governor of Malvern School and chair of the Tewkesbury Abbey Appeal.

She continued to be a member of the NSPCC central executive committee until 1992 and later became a vice-president. For her work for the Women's Voluntary Service' she was appointed OBE, and for her numerous subsequent posts in public service was advanced, in 1983, to DBE.

Death
She died in 2001, eight days before her 87th birthday, and was interred near her home in Worcestershire.

References

External links

Countess Mountbatten of Burma, "Rosamund Holland-Martin" (obituary), The Guardian, 4 July 2001
"Royals at funeral of Lady Holland-Martin", Worcester News, 5 July 2001

1914 births
2001 deaths
British social welfare officials
Dames Commander of the Order of the British Empire
Deputy Lieutenants of Hereford and Worcester
Hornby family
People from Dorset
People from London
People from Wychavon (district)
National Society for the Prevention of Cruelty to Children people
Wives of knights